Thomas William Asmussen (September 26, 1878 – August 21, 1963) was a Major League Baseball catcher. In 2 career games, he had no hits in 5 at-bats. He threw right-handed and it is not known which hand he batted with.

Asmussen was born in Chicago and died in Arlington Heights, Illinois.

External links 

1878 births
1963 deaths
American people of Danish descent
Boston Doves players
Eau Claire-Chippewa Falls Orphans players
Joliet Standards players
Major League Baseball catchers
Minor league baseball managers
Peoria Distillers players
Springfield Foot Trackers players
Baseball players from Chicago